Jeff Nelsen (born December 11, 1969) is a Canadian French horn player and is Professor of Horn at the Jacobs School of Music at Indiana University in Bloomington, IN. He has performed in the Winnipeg Symphony Orchestra, the Montreal Symphony, the New York Philharmonic, and the Chicago, Boston, Cincinnati, St. Louis, and National symphonies.

Biography 

Jeff is a horn player who has thrilled and inspired audiences and students around the world. While studying music at McGill University in Montreal, Jeff won an audition for an orchestra. He left school to take the position as fourth horn in the Winnipeg Symphony; the following year he won the audition for fourth horn in the Montreal Symphony.

Since then, and for the past twenty years Jeff has been living his dreams full out and fearlessly. Jeff toured and recorded for eight years with Canadian Brass, he has performed recitals and concerti with orchestras in North and South America, Asia, Europe, and Australia, and he is a professor at the prestigious Indiana University Jacobs School of Music.

Jeff's biggest passion is talking others into reaching their dreams through what he calls Fearless Performance. The world agrees this is an important subject, as this is a topic on which Jeff recently gave a TEDx Talk. Other performing experiences for Jeff have included playing the full run of two Broadway shows ("Chitty Chitty Bang Bang" and "The Pirate Queen" - two of Broadway's most expensive flops – as a result, he's not allowed back there!), touring with Michael Bolton and Barry Manilow, recording dozens of movie soundtracks, and performing in the horn sections of orchestras including the New York Philharmonic, the Chicago, Boston, Cincinnati, St. Louis, Montreal, Vancouver, and National Symphonies, and the Balkan Gypsy funk band of Slavic Soul Party. With Canadian Brass, Jeff has also performed with the Philadelphia and Cleveland Orchestras, the symphonies of Atlanta, Baltimore, Buffalo, Colorado, Detroit, Houston, Milwaukee, Minnesota, New Jersey, Phoenix, Rotterdam, San Francisco, Seattle, Toronto, with the esteemed German, London, and El Sistema brass ensembles, and special annual concerts with the principal brass of the New York Philharmonic and Philadelphia Orchestra. Most recently, in December, 2012, Jeff had a blast performing with the “Distant Worlds - Final Fantasy 25th Anniversary Concert” in Chicago.

Jeff's other most recent exciting accomplishment is becoming a magician member of the “Academy of Magical Arts” at the world famous Magic Castle in Los Angeles. Jeff helped design his own model of Dieter Otto horn (180KA-JN) and his own mouthpiece as well. Jeff gives back to the horn community as a member of the International Horn Society's advisory council and the board of directors for the International Horn Competition of America.

Media Links 
 TEDxBloomington -- Jeff Nelsen -- "Fearless Performance"
 Fearless Performance for Musicians - Indiana Public Media
 Brahms Horn Trio - Interview Video
 Brahms Horn Trio - Performance Video
 Jeff Nelsen plays Nagy's Happy Blues on french horn in Chile
 Canadian Brass, Paganini Variations feat. Jeff Nelsen, horn

Jeff Nelsen was a huge hit as one of the featured artists at the 37th International Horn Society Symposium ( June 2005). He is one of the most dynamic individuals that I have ever worked with, and is among the finest horn players that I have ever heard. If you know Jeff, you are better for it. If you don't know Jeff, you should.
 — Skip Snead, Director of the School of Music, University of Alabama

Discography Selections 

 Brahms Horn Trio: Op. 40 w/Mozart Horn Quintet, adapted for Horn Trio by Tony Rickard
 2010, Opening Day Records
 The Planets with Cincinnati Symphony Orchestra
 Cincinnati Symphony Orchestra
 Paavo Järvi, conductor
 2009, Telarc
 Pirate Queen, Original Broadway Cast Recording
 2007, Sony Classics
 Failure to Launch
 2006, Paramount Pictures
 Lucky Number Slevin
 2006, Capitol Films
 Stan Kenton Christmas Carols - Boston Brass and Friends
 2006, Summit Classical
 Stealth
 2003, Hal Leonard DVD
 Elizabeth Rex Soundtrack
 2003, Rhombus Media
 I Found Love
 Denzal Sinclaire
 2002, Blue Note Records
 Pitch Black
 2000, Interscope Communications Pictures
 The Bride of Chucky
 1998, Midwinter Productions, Inc.
 Air Bud
 1997, Walt Disney Pictures
 Berlioz Requiem
 Montréal Symphony Orchestra
 Charles Dutoit, conductor
 1995, London/Decca
 Bartók Concerto for Orchestra
 Montréal Symphony Orchestra
 Charles Dutoit, conductor
 1994, London/Decca DVD

Recordings with Canadian Brass
 Stars and Stripes- Canadian Brass Salute America
 2010, Opening Day Records
 Echo; Glory of Gabrieli
 2009, Opening Day Records
 Swing That Music
 2009, Opening Day Records
 Legends
 2008, Opening Day Records
 Bach
 2008, Opening Day Records
 High Society
 2007, Opening Day Records
 Christmas Tradition
 2007, Opening Day Records
 And So It Goes, Giles Tomkins
 2006, Opening Day Records
 Magic Horn
 2004, Opening Day Records
 Amazing Brass
 2002, Opening Day Records
 Holidays with Canadian Brass
 2000, Opening Day Records

External links 
 
 Nina Yoshida Nelsen
 Canadian Brass
 Jacobs School of Music, Indiana University

Horn players
Jacobs School of Music faculty
Living people
1969 births